Kicks is the second studio album by Scottish band 1990s.

Track listing

"Vondel Park" – 3:48
"Tell Me When You're Ready" – 2:42
"I Don't Even Know What That Is" – 2:53
"59" – 3:51
"Kickstrasse" – 2:55
"Everybody Please Relax" – 3:24
"Balthazar" – 3:57
"Local Science" – 3:34
"The Box" – 4:07
"Giddy Up" – 2:42
"The Kids" – 2:34
"Sparks" – 3:30
"Easter Bunny (iTunes Bonus Track)" – 2:48

External links
1990s Official website

2009 albums
1990s (band) albums
Albums produced by Bernard Butler
Rough Trade Records albums